Salacia mamba is a species of plant in the family Celastraceae. It is found in Cameroon, the Republic of the Congo, and Gabon. Its natural habitat is subtropical or tropical moist lowland forests. It is threatened by habitat loss.

References

Vulnerable plants
Flora of Cameroon
Flora of Ghana
Flora of the Republic of the Congo
mamba
Taxonomy articles created by Polbot